The Best of White Lion is the first greatest hits compilation album from the glam metal band White Lion, released in September 1992. The compilation features all of White Lion's charted singles from their three most successful albums: Pride, Big Game and Mane Attraction.

Overview
The album features live versions of "Lady of the Valley" and "All You Need Is Rock'N Roll". "Broken Heart" was initially released on the band's debut album Fight to Survive but later re-recorded on the Mane Attraction album.
In some countries, "You're All I Need" (from the band's last studio album Mane Attraction) is included as the first track of the compilation, sometimes as a hidden (unlisted) track.

In 2000 a second best of album was released titled "White Lion Hits" which was also re-released as "When the Children Cry and Other Hits" in 2007 and In 2002 an updated compilation was released titled "The Essential White Lion".

Track listing 
 "Wait" - 4:01
 "Radar Love" - 5:56
 "Broken Heart" - 4:07
 "Hungry" - 3:56
 "Little Fighter" - 4:22
 "Lights and Thunder" - 8:06
 "All You Need Is Rock 'n' Roll" (Live Version) - 5:41
 "When the Children Cry" - 4:22
 "Love Don't Come Easy" - 4:09
 "Cry for Freedom" - 6:11
 "Lady of the Valley" (Live Version) - 7:40
 "Tell Me" - 4:29
 "Farewell to You" - 4:21

All songs written by Bratta & Tramp, except for "Radar Love" (which is a Golden Earring cover).

Band members 
 Mike Tramp - vocals
 Vito Bratta - guitars
 James Lomenzo - bass
 Greg D'Angelo - drums

References

External links 
 Official White Lion Website
 Official Mike Tramp Website

1992 compilation albums
White Lion albums
Albums produced by Michael Wagener
Atlantic Records compilation albums